Westerlund 1-20 (abbreviated to Wd 1-20 or just W20) is a red supergiant (RSG) located in the Westerlund 1 super star cluster. Its radius was calculated to be around 965 solar radii (6.72 × 108 km, 4.48 au), making it one of the largest stars discovered so far. This corresponds to a volume 899 million times bigger than the Sun. If placed at the center of the Solar System, the photosphere of Westerlund 1-20 would almost reach the orbit of Jupiter.

The star is classified as a luminous cool supergiant emitting most of its energy in the infrared spectrum. W20 occupies the upper right corner of the Hertzsprung-Russell diagram. Using the effective temperature of 3,500 K, the bolometric luminosity of 126,000 L☉ and the solar effective temperature of 5,772 K, its radius can be calculated using the Stefan-Boltzmann law.

Westerlund 1-20 was observed to have an extended, cometary shaped nebula, similar to the other red supergiant Westerlund 1 W26. It is therefore likely that its morphology was affected by either the intracluster medium or the cluster wind of Westerlund 1. The nebulae of both Westerlund 1-20 and Westerlund 1 W26 are extended outward from the cluster core and most bright at inward direction, indicating the outward cluster wind.

See also 
 Westerlund 1-237
 Westerlund 1-75

Notes

References 

Ara (constellation)
M-type supergiants
J16470468-4551238